The 2010–11 season of Hertha BSC began between 14 August 2010 with a DFB-Pokal match against SC Pfullendorf, and ended on 15 May 2011, the last match day of the 2. Bundesliga, with a match against FC Augsburg. With a 1–0 victory over MSV Duisburg on 25 April 2011, Hertha secured promotion to the Bundesliga with three matches left to play. Two weeks later, Hertha secured the championship with a 2–0 over Erzgebirge Aue. In the DFB-Pokal, Hertha were eliminated in the 2nd round.

Transfers

Summer transfers

In:

Out:

Winter transfers

In:

Out:

Goals and appearances

|}
Last Updated: 15 May 2011

Notes
 Not a full-time member of the first team.
 Left Hertha in the winter transfer period.

Results

2. Bundesliga

Note: Results are given with Hertha BSC score listed first.

DFB-Pokal

Note: Results are given with Hertha BSC score listed first.

Kits

See also
2010–11 2. Fußball-Bundesliga
2010–11 DFB-Pokal
Hertha BSC

Hertha BSC seasons
Hertha BSC